David Nathaniel Philipps (born 1977) is an American journalist and author who has been awarded The Pulitzer Prize twice, most recently in 2022. His work has largely focused on the human impact of the wars in Iraq and Afghanistan. He is a national correspondent for The New York Times and author of three non-fiction books.

Career 
David Philipps has been a military correspondent for The New York Times since 2014. Previous to that he was a reporter for The Gazette in Colorado Springs.

In 2022 Philipps was part of a team of reporters awarded The Pulitzer Prize for international reporting, for a series that exposed how United States military airstrikes in Syria, Iraq and Afghanistan caused thousands of civilian deaths that had never been publicly reported.

The author's 2021 book, ALPHA, examines the high-profile court martial of Navy SEAL chief Edward Gallagher and the history and culture of the elite SEAL commando teams that lead to what the men who served under him testified were a number of cold-blooded murders.

In 2014, Philipps was awarded the Pulitzer for national reporting for a three-day series "Other Than Honorable" in The Gazette of Colorado Springs on the treatment of injured American soldiers being discharged without military benefits. 

He has also been named a finalist for the Pulitzer Prize twice.

Philipps won the 2009 Livingston Award for his reporting on violence in infantry troops returning from Iraq. His book, Lethal Warriors chronicles how the 4th Brigade Combat Team of the 12th Infantry Regiment, stationed at Fort Carson, Colorado, produced a high number of murders after soldiers returned from unusually violent combat tours. Philipps worked for eight years as an enterprise reporter at the Colorado Springs Gazette.

Philipps has written extensively about wild horses in the West, and gained attention in 2012 when U.S. Secretary of Interior Ken Salazar threatened to punch him for asking about problems in the department's wild horse program. Philipps's subsequent reporting led to state and federal investigation of the wild horse program and its largest horse buyer. His 2017 book, Wild Horse Country, traces the culture and history that created modern wild horse management. 

Philipps graduated from Middlebury College in 2000 and earned a master's degree from the Columbia University Graduate School of Journalism in 2002.

Education 
Middlebury College, 2000

Columbia University School of Journalism, 2002

Notable works

ALPHA: Eddie Gallagher and the war for the soul of the Navy SEALs
"Death in Navy SEALs Reveals a Culture of Brutality, Cheating and Drugs " The New York Times, Aug. 30, 2022
"How the U.S. Hid Airstrikes that Killed Dozens of Civilians " The New York Times, Nov. 13, 2021
"Civlian Deaths Mounted as Secret Unit Pounded ISIS " The New York Times, December 12, 2021
"The Unseen Scars of those who Kill by Remote Control " The New York Times, April 15, 2022
Wild Horse Country, the history, myth and future of the mustang, America's horse
"Wild Horses Adopted under a Federal Program are going to Slaughter" The New York Times, July 20, 2021
"Anger and Anguish for SEALs who reported Edward Gallagher " The New York Times, Dec. 27, 2019
"Navy SEALs were warned against reporting their chief " The New York Times, April 23, 2019
"Wounded Warrior Project Spends Lavishly on Itself " The New York Times, January 27, 2016]
"In unit stalked by suicide, members try to save one another" ," The New York Times, Sept. 19, 2015
"Other than Honorable," The Colorado Springs Gazette, May 19, 2013
"Casualties of War ," The Colorado Springs Gazette, July 28, 2009.
"All the missing horses," ProPublica, Sept. 28, 2012
"Honor and Deception," The Colorado Springs Gazette, Dec. 1, 2013

References

External links 

1977 births
American male journalists
Living people
Pulitzer Prize for National Reporting winners
Livingston Award winners for National Reporting